George Cholmondeley, Viscount Malpas (17 October 1724 – 15 March 1764) was a British soldier and Member of Parliament.

Cholmondeley was the eldest son of George Cholmondeley, 3rd Earl of Cholmondeley, and Lady Mary Walpole, daughter of Prime Minister Robert Walpole, 1st Earl of Orford. He gained the courtesy title of Viscount Malpas when his father succeeded as third Earl of Cholmondeley in 1733. He fought in the Battle of Fontenoy in 1745 and later achieved the rank of Lieutenant-Colonel in the 65th Regiment of Foot.

In 1754 he was elected to the House of Commons for Bramber, a seat he held until 1761, and then to represent Corfe Castle between 1761 and 1764.

He was given the colonelcy for life of the 65th Foot in 1760.

After returning from duty with his regiment in Ireland, Lord Malpas died after five days' illness with 'inflammation of the bowels' on 15 March 1764, aged 39, predeceasing his father. He had married Hester Edwardes, daughter of Sir Francis Edwardes, 3rd Baronet, in 1747. His son George succeeded his grandfather as 4th Earl of Cholmondeley in 1770 and was created Marquess of Cholmondeley in 1815. Lady Malpas died in 1794.

References

Kidd, Charles, Williamson, David (editors). Debrett's Peerage and Baronetage (1990 edition). New York: St Martin's Press, 1990.

|-

1724 births
1764 deaths
British courtesy viscounts
Heirs apparent who never acceded
British Army personnel of the War of the Austrian Succession
65th Regiment of Foot officers
British Army generals
Members of the Parliament of Great Britain for English constituencies
Whig (British political party) MPs for English constituencies
British MPs 1754–1761
British MPs 1761–1768
George